The Goodwill Historic District, Chopawamsic RDA Camp 1 near Triangle, Virginia dates from 1934. It has also been known as Prince William Forest Park, as Camp Lichtman, and as Boys' Camp. It was listed as a historic district on the National Register of Historic Places on June 12, 1989.

The historic district recognizes the 1934-1940 development of Chopawamsic Recreational Demonstration Area (RDA), specifically the role played by RDA Camp 1, the smallest of four Recreational Demonstration Areas within what became Prince William Forest Park.  The camp's landscape and structures created after 1938 were designed by architects, engineers and draftsmen employed by the National Park Service.

See also
Catoctin Mountain Recreational Demonstration Area, Maryland
St. Croix Recreational Demonstration Area, Minnesota

References

Historic districts in Prince William County, Virginia
National Register of Historic Places in Prince William County, Virginia
Recreational Demonstration Areas
Historic districts on the National Register of Historic Places in Virginia
Prince William Forest Park
Civilian Conservation Corps camps
National Park Service rustic in Virginia